Hugh Fraser (1891–1944), was a British colonial administrator. He was the last acting Colonial Secretary of Straits Settlements before the fall of Singapore in 15 February 1942 to the Japanese Occupation and was interned in Changi Prison. He subsequently died in Outram Road Prison in 1944.

Education
Fraser was educated in Wellington College and Exeter College, Oxford.

Career
In 1917, Fraser was the Third Assistant Secretary at Federal Secretariat and Private Secretary to Chief Secretary of Federated Malay States (FMS). After several terms of office as District Officer, he went on to Kedah as Acting Assistant Adviser and Acting Legal Adviser.

In June 1927, Fraser was the Assistant Treasurer FMS and State Treasurer (Selangor). He was later appointed to the Malayan Establishment Office and 1936 as Secretary to High Commissioner of Malaya.

In 1937, Fraser was the Acting Under-Secretary of FMS and April 1937 Acting Federal Secretary FMS when Mr Christopher Dominic Ahearne was away. In December 1937, Fraser was appointed as Under-Secretary of FMS.

On 27 January 1942, Fraser took over as Acting Colonial Secretary of Straits Settlements from Sir S W Jones before the fall of Singapore to the Japanese Occupation and was subsequently interned.

Interned and death

Fraser was interned at Changi Prison during Japanese Occupation of Singapore. On 10 October 1943, after the Operation Jaywick incident, he was arrested along with others when the kempeitai raided the internment camp. He died as a detainee of kempeitai at Outram Road Prison in 1944.

References

1891 births
1944 deaths
Administrators in British Singapore
Chief Secretaries of Singapore
Federated Malay States people
Straits Settlements people
British people who died in Japanese internment camps
British people in British Malaya